The Most Hon. Dermot Richard Claud Chichester, 7th Marquess of Donegall, LVO (18 April 1916 – 19 April 2007), known as the Hon. Dermot Chichester from 1924 to 1953, and as Baron Templemore from 1953 to 1975, was a British soldier, landowner and member of the House of Lords. Lord Donegall was usually known to his family and friends as Dermey Donegall.

Biography
Lord Donegall was the second son of the 4th Baron Templemore, whom he succeeded in the barony. He was educated at Harrow and the Royal Military College, Sandhurst.

He served in the Second World War as a captain with the 7th Queen's Own Hussars in Egypt. He was reported missing in action and believed to have been killed, but had been captured in Libya in November 1942 during the North African campaign. He remained a prisoner of war in Italy until escaping in June 1944. He was promoted Major that year, and retired from the British Army in 1949, but served for several years with the Leicestershire Yeomanry.

His elder brother, Arthur, having been killed in 1942 serving with the Coldstream Guards, Chichester succeeded his father as the 5th Baron Templemore in 1953. In 1975, he also succeeded his distant cousin to become the 7th Marquess of Donegall, being the descendant of the 1st Baron Templemore, grandson of Arthur Chichester, 1st Marquess of Donegall. He also inherited other titles and was Lord High Admiral of Lough Neagh.

Lord Donegall became a member of the Honourable Corps of Gentlemen at Arms in 1966, and was its Standard Bearer from 1984 to 1986. He was appointed LVO in 1986, and was for many years an active member of the Conservative Monday Club. In 1981, he became Grandmaster of the Grand Lodge of Ireland, a post he held until 1992. Lord Donegall also served as master of the Wexford Hounds. He bred horses, including The Proclamation, winner of the Punchestown champion hurdle in 1989, and Dunbrody Millar, winner of the Topham Trophy at Aintree in 2007.

In 1946, he married Lady Josceline Gabrielle Legge (1918–1995), daughter of the 7th Earl of Dartmouth. They had a son, Patrick Chichester (born in 1952, and who used the courtesy title of Earl of Belfast from 1975 to 2007), and two daughters, Lady Jennifer (1949–2013) and Lady Juliet (b. 1954). The Marquess lived at the family home of Dunbrody Park in Arthurstown in the southwest of County Wexford.

References

 Copping, Robert, The Monday Club – Crisis and After May 1975, page 25, published by the Current Affairs Information Service, Ilford, Essex, (P/B).
Obituary, The Daily Telegraph, 20 July 2007

External links

1916 births
2007 deaths
7th Queen's Own Hussars officers
British World War II prisoners of war
Escapees from Italian detention
Formerly missing people
People educated at Harrow School
Graduates of the Royal Military College, Sandhurst
Lieutenants of the Royal Victorian Order
British Army personnel of World War II
World War II prisoners of war held by Italy
Dermot
Leicestershire Yeomanry officers
Politicians from County Wexford
7
Honourable Corps of Gentlemen at Arms
Missing in action of World War II
Younger sons of barons
Donegall